The Perot Museum of Nature and Science (shortened to Perot Museum) is a natural history and science museum in Dallas, Texas in Victory Park. The museum was named in honor of Margot and Ross Perot. The current chief executive officer of the museum is Dr. Linda Abraham-Silver.

Background

History
On June 6, 1936, the Dallas Museum of Natural History opened to the public as part of the 1936 Texas Centennial Exhibition. On September 20, 1946, the Dallas Health Museum was founded by a group chartered as the Dallas Academy of Medicine. It was renamed the Dallas Health and Science Museum in 1958. The name was changed yet again to the Science Place in 1981. In 1995, the Dallas Children's Museum was founded elsewhere.

In 2006, Perot Museum CEO Nicole Small oversaw the uniting of the Dallas Museum of Natural History, the Science Place, and the Dallas Children's Museum at Fair Park. Following the merger, the museum was in three buildings there, featuring an IMAX-style theater, a planetarium, an extensive exhibit hall, and its own  paleontology lab. The museum moved on December 1, 2012, to a new facility in Victory Park.

On June 1, 2014, CEO Small was replaced by Colleen Walker.

Walker resigned as CEO in 2017, and was replaced in 2017 by Linda Abraham-Silver.

Donation and endowment
The Victory Park campus museum was named in honor of Margot and Ross Perot as the result of a $50,000,000 gift made by their adult children Ross Perot, Jr., Nancy Perot Mulford, Suzanne Perot McGee, Carolyn Perot Rathjen, and Katherine Perot Reeves. The $185,000,000 fundraising goal, slated to provide for the site acquisition, exhibition planning and design, construction of the new building, education programs and an endowment, was achieved by November 2011, more than a year before the museum's scheduled opening in December 2012. The donated funds enabled the museum to be built, incurring no debt or public funding.

Victory Park campus

The 180,000 square foot facility has six floors and stands about 14 stories high. Five of the floors are accessible to the public and house 11 permanent exhibit halls as well as 6 learning labs. The top floor houses the museum's administration offices. The Victory Park campus opened its doors to the public on December 1, 2012. Approximately 6,000 visitors came to the museum on its first day of operation.

Building design

Designed by Thom Mayne of Morphosis Architects, the building was conceived as a large cube floating over a landscaped plinth (or base). 

The stone roof, which features a landscape of drought-tolerant greenery, was inspired by Dallas surroundings. The plinth was landscaped with a 1-acre rolling green roof comprising rock and native drought-resistant grasses that reflects Texas' indigenous landscape and demonstrate a living system that will evolve naturally. Building on the museum's commitment to resource conservation, the new building has a rainwater collection system that captures run-off water from the roof and parking lot, satisfying 74% of the museum's non-potable water needs and 100% of its irrigation needs.

The building features a  continuous flow escalator housed within a  glass casing that extends diagonally outside the building cube. To maximize sustainability, the building also features LED lighting, off-grid energy generation technology and solar-powered water heating. Skylights draw natural sunlight into the atrium and to the other spaces.

The building has secured the highest possible 4 Green Globes from the Green Building Initiative. It got a rating of an overall 85% on the Green Globes rating scale and 100% for its design and its sustainable performance measures. Green Globes is a nationally recognized green building guidance and assessment program in the United States.

Permanent exhibit halls

Temporary exhibit halls

The Hoglund Foundation Theater A National Geographic Experience
The 297-seat Americans with Disabilities Act (ADA) compliant theater has a 2D, 3D 4K digital projection and sound system. The theater features a variety of films, from educational features and documentaries to experimental independent films.

Educational outreach
The museum creates a Teacher's Guide, which is a booklet and online publication that is distributed to North Texas educators. The guide outlines programming designed for children pre-K to 12th grade in earth and space sciences, life and natural sciences, chemistry, physical sciences and engineering. Programming reinforces Texas Essential Knowledge and Skills (TEKS) objectives.

There are four educational outreach opportunities: field trips to the museum, onsite programming at schools (in the classroom and after school), Community Engagement through the Museum's TECH Truck and The Whynauts virtual, bilingual video series.

Field trips
Students can explore 11 permanent exhibit halls, experience educational films in their theater, and take advantage of TEKS-aligned onsite classroom or auditorium programming. Further learning, available through program extensions, is held in the learning labs and auditorium of the museum's Lower Level. The museum also features educational films, offered in partnership with National Geographic.

Onsite programming at schools
Museum educators offer 26 programs that can be taught in schools’ classrooms, presented to large groups in auditoriums, or showcased as part of after-school programming.

Community Engagement
The TECH Truck brings hands-on discovery directly to community centers programs, libraries, parks, public events, out-of-school programs and more — providing science-based experiences for the public.

The Whynauts
Bring the wonders of the Perot Museum to your classroom through an interactive, bilingual, STEM educational series.

See also

List of nature centers in Texas
List of museums in North Texas
Heard Natural Science Museum and Wildlife Sanctuary
Fort Worth Museum of Science and History
National Register of Historic Places listings in Dallas County, Texas
List of Dallas Landmarks

References

External links

Official Web site of Perot Museum of Nature and Science
Dallas' Perot Museum designed to fit with Texas-specific public school curriculum 
Perot Museum - Sports Run Exhibit

Fair Park
Museums in Dallas
Science museums in Texas
Children's museums in Texas
Natural history museums in Texas
Paleontology in Texas